The 1961 BYU Cougars football team represented Brigham Young University (BYU) as a member of the Skyline Conference during the 1961 NCAA University Division football season. In their first season under head coach Hal Mitchell, the Cougars compiled an overall record of 2–8 with a mark of 2–4 against conference opponents, tied for fifth place in the Skyline, and were outscored by all opponents by a combined total of 289 to 130.

The team's statistical leaders included Eldon Fortie with 469 passing yards, 422 rushing yards, and 891 yards of total offense, and Paul Allen with 261 receiving yards and 58 points scored.

Schedule

References

BYU
BYU Cougars football seasons
BYU Cougars football